Discomagic Records (1979–1997), owned by Severo Lombardoni was the largest dance record label in Italy. It spawned a large number of sub-labels from the early 1980s to the early 1990s and it set the standards for an entire genre of music ranging from Italo disco to Italo house.

With S.r.I as its initial legal form, the company changed its legal form to S.p.A. in 1994, and to S.a.S. in 1995. Due to financial problems, Discomagic ceased its operations in 1997. Lombardoni sold the company to Bernhard Mikulski's ZYX Music. However, some of its sublabels still exist to date. The sublabels owned by Mauro Farina were brought into what became SAIFAM Music Group. Roberto Zanetti's Dance World Attack became an independent label, but was sold to Sony Music in 1999.

Sub-levels

References

External links
 

Italian record labels
Electronic music record labels
Italo disco